Deadfall may refer to:
 Deadfall trap, a kind of trap for large animals, consisting of a heavy board or log that falls onto the prey
 Deadfall (1968 film), starring Michael Caine, Eric Portman, and Giovanna Ralli
 Deadfall, a BBC radio play (1987) by R.D. Wingfield
 Deadfall (1993 film), featuring Nicolas Cage, Charlie Sheen, James Coburn, and Peter Fonda
 Deadfall (2012 film), a 2012 film starring Eric Bana, Olivia Wilde, and Charlie Hunnam
 Deadfall (novel), a 1997 novel in the Virgin New Adventures series of Doctor Who
 Deadfall (band), a British thrash metal band from Nottingham
 Deadfall Creek, a river in Alaska
 Deadfall Adventures, a video game by The Farm 51
 Dead to Fall, a metal-core band
 A fallen tree, such as a nurse log

See also
A Dying Fall (2012), Elly Griffiths' fifth Ruth Galloway novel
The Prison Break episode, Dead Fall
Döda Fallet, a dry waterfall near Ragunda in Sweden